The Portuguese oyster, Crassostrea angulata, is a species of oyster found in the southwest Iberian Peninsula, closely related to the Pacific oyster. Although first identified as a native European species, genetic studies have suggested the Portuguese oyster originated from the Pacific coast of Asia and was introduced to Europe by Portuguese trading ships in the 16th century.  The species is usually found in coastal river mouths and estuaries.

Commercial value
Prior to decimation by iridoviral disease in 1969, C. angulata was extensively cultivated in France and Portugal as part of the edible oyster industry.  The Pacific oyster, which is more resistant to the disease, was introduced in the 1970s and has since replaced C. angulata as the main commercial species.  The Portuguese oyster is cultured commercially in Taiwan.

References

Ostreidae
Bivalves described in 1819
Molluscs of Europe
Taxa named by Jean-Baptiste Lamarck